is a former Japanese football player.

Playing career
Hagihara was born in Yamanashi Prefecture on April 7, 1971. After graduating from Tokai University, he joined the Japan Football League club Ventforet Kofu. The club was promoted to the new J2 League in 1999. He played four matches in J2 and retired at the end of the 1999 season.

Club statistics

References

External links

1971 births
Living people
Tokai University alumni
Association football people from Yamanashi Prefecture
Japanese footballers
J2 League players
Japan Football League (1992–1998) players
Ventforet Kofu players
Association football defenders